Paul Ramon Matia (born 1937) is a former United States district judge of the United States District Court for the Northern District of Ohio.

Education and career

Matia was born in Cleveland, Ohio. He received a Bachelor of Arts degree from Case Western Reserve University in 1959. He received a Juris Doctor from Harvard Law School in 1962. He was in private practice in Fairview Park, Ohio from 1962 to 1963. He was a law clerk, Court of Common Pleas of Cuyahoga County, Ohio from 1963 to 1966. He was an assistant state attorney general of Ohio from 1966 to 1969. He was an administrative assistant to state attorney general of Ohio from 1969 to 1970. He was in private practice in Fairview Park from 1971 to 1974. He was a member of the Ohio State Senate from 1971 to 1975. He was in private practice in Cleveland from 1975 to 1985. He once again served in the state senate from 1979 to 1982 He was a Vice President of Van Meter, Ashbrook & Associates from 1982 to 1984. He was a judge on the Court of Common Pleas of Cuyahoga County, Ohio from 1985 to 1991.

Federal judicial service

He was confirmed by the United States Senate on November 15, 1991, and received his commission on November 18, 1991. He served as Chief Judge from 1999 to 2004. During his time as a judge, he was notable for restoring John Demjanjuk's United States citizenship in 1998 but later revoking it in 2002 after a new trial. He assumed senior status on December 31, 2004. Matia's service ended on May 31, 2005, due to retirement. Matia later worked for the Porter Wright Morris & Arthur law firm in its Cleveland office, but has since retired.

References

Sources
 
 Matia's profile at Porter Wright Morris & Arthur

1937 births
Living people
Harvard Law School alumni
Case Western Reserve University alumni
Republican Party Ohio state senators
Ohio state court judges
Judges of the United States District Court for the Northern District of Ohio
United States district court judges appointed by George H. W. Bush
20th-century American judges
Lawyers from Cleveland
Politicians from Cleveland